This is a list of the complete squads for the rugby union 2021 Rugby Europe Championship contested annually by the national rugby teams of Georgia, Netherlands, Portugal, Romania, Russia and Spain. Georgia are the defending champions.

Note: Number of caps and players' ages are indicated as of 6 March 2021 – the tournament's opening day (except for the Netherlands who played their first match in July). For players added to a squad during the tournament, their caps and age are indicated as of the date of their call-up.

Netherlands 

Head Coach:  Zane Gardiner

Georgia 
On the 26th of February 2021, Maisahvili named a 32-man squad for the Rugby Europe Championship.

Head coach:  Levan Maisashvili

Portugal
On the 1st of March 2021, Lagisquet named a 30-man squad for the Rugby Europe Championship.

Head Coach:  Patrice Lagisquet

Call-ups
On the 8th of March, Duarte Diniz, Anthony Alves, Francisco Fernandes, Duarte Torgal and José Roque were called up to the squad, while Thibault Nardi returned to their club.

On the 19th of March, Loïc Bournonville was called up to the squad, while Nuno Mascarenhas and Luigi Dias returned to their club.

On the 6th of July, João Mateus, Bruno Rocha, Jean Sousa, Thibault de Freitas, Boaventura Almeida, Pedro Rosa, Pedro Lucas, João Freudenthal and Manuel Cardoso Pinto were called up to the squad for the first time this season, while Loïc Bournonville, Geoffrey Moïse, Eric dos Santos, Frederico Couto, José Roque, Francisco Sousa, Vasco Ribeiro, Antonio Vidinha and Simão Bento were not re-called to the national team.

Romania
On the 2nd of March 2021, Robinson named a 36-man squad for the Rugby Europe Championship.

Head Coach:  Andy Robinson

Call-ups
On the 9th of March, Alexandru Țiglă was called up to the squad, while Alexandru Țăruș and Marius Antonescu temporarily returned to their club, yet Julien Bartoli permanently returned to their club.

On the 15th of March, Kamil Sobota was called up to the squad to replace Mihai Macovei who will temporarily return to their club while Ionel Badiu, Cristi Chirică and Dragoș Ser returned to their clubs due to injuries.

On the 22nd of March, Florian Roșu and Cosmin Iliuță were called up to the squad along with Cristi Chirică who re-joined the squad while Alex Gordaș, Ionuț Mureșan, Damian Strătilă and Cătălin Fercu returned to their clubs.

On the 18th of October, Florin Bărdașu, Dorin Tică, Bogdan Doroftei, Andrei Toader, Alexandru Alexe, Moa Mua Maliepo, Jason Tomane, Hinckley Vaovasa, Sioeli Lama and Marius Simionescu were called up to the squad for the first time this season while Cristi Chirică was re-called to the national team, whereas Eugen Căpățână, Johannes van Heerden, Kamil Sobota, Alexandru Țiglă and Stephen Shennan were not re-called to the national team.

On the 9th of November, Robert Neagu was called up to the squad while Alex Gordaș, Dorin Tică, Bogdan Doroftei, Alexandru Alexe, Vlad Neculau, Moa Mua Maliepo, Vlăduț Popa and Sioeli Lama returned to their clubs.

Russia
On the 17th of February 2021, Jones named a 32-man squad for the Rugby Europe Championship.

Head Coach:  Lyn Jones

Call-ups
On the 14th of June, Shamil Davudov, Denis Mashkin, Nikita Bekov, Evgeny Elgin, Vadim Zharkov, Artémy Gallo, Stepan Khokhlov, Maxime Féougier, Dmitry Gerasimov, Denis Simplikevich and Nikita Churashov were called up to the squad for the first time this season, while Stanislav Sel'skiy, Kirill Gotovtsev, Stepan Seryakov, Bogdan Fedotko, German Silenko, Roman Khodin, Alexandr Belosludtsev, Khetag Dzobelov, Daniil Potikhanov and Alexey Golov were not re-called to the national team.

On the 6th of July, Viktor Kononov was called up to the squad while German Silenko was re-called to the national team, whereas Andrei Ostrikov, Artémy Gallo and Alexandr Budychenko returned to their clubs.

On the 20th of October, Anton Drozdov, Dmitry Parkhomenko, Alishan Umarov, Ivan Chepraga, Dmitry Gritsenko, Egor Zykov Alexander Ivanov, Pavel Kirillov, Vitaly Klimov, Vitaly Zhivatov, Efim Ryabishchuk and Gleb Farkov were called up to the squad for the first time this season while Artémy Gallo and Roman Khodin were re-called to the national team, whereas Nikita Bekov and Maxime Féougier returned to their clubs, along with Shamil Magomedov, Denis Mashkin, Stepan Seryakov, Evgeny Elgin, German Silenko, Vadim Zharkov, Victor Gresev, Konstantin Uzunov, Ramil Gaisin, Dmitry Gerasimov, Andrei Karzanov, Victor Kononov, Denis Simplikevich and Nikita Churashov, all of who returned to their clubs for the Rugby Europe Super Cup matches.

On the 1st of November, Kirill Gotovtsev, German Silenko Konstantin Uzunov, Ramil Gaisin, Khetag Dzobelov, Andrei Karzanov, Victor Kononov and Daniil Potikhanov were re-called to the squad while Shamil Davudov, 
Efim Ryabishchuk and Gleb Farkov returned to their clubs.

Spain
On the 8th of March 2021, Santos named a 32-man squad for the Rugby Europe Championship.

Head Coach:  Santiago Santos

Call-ups
On the 15th of March, Josh Peters, Gautier Gibbouin, Guillaume Rouet, Manuel Ordas, Fabien Perrin and Richard Stewart were called up to the squad, while Victor Sánchez, David Barrera, Pierre Barthere, Facundo Munilla, Daniel Barranco and Pablo Ortiz returned to their clubs.

On the 22nd of March, Victor Sánchez was re-called up to the squad while Andrea Rabago and Fréderic Quercy returned to their clubs, the latter due to a match suspension.

On the 24th of June, Juan Pablo Guido, Afaese Tauli, Facundo Domínguez, Gabriel Vélez, Facundo Munilla, David Barrios, Diego Periel, Julen Goia Sergio Molinero, J. W. Bell and Guillermo Domínguez were called up to the squad for the first time this season while Fréderic Quercy, Facundo Munilla and Pablo Ortiz were re-called to the national team, whereas Kalokalo Gavidi, Josh Peters, Brice Ferrer, Oier Goia, Gautier Gibouin, Kerman Aurrekoetxea, Guillaume Rouet, Manuel Ordas, Alejandro Alonso, Jordi Jorba, Brad Linklater and Charly Malié were not re-called to the national team.

On the 12th of July, Kalokalo Gavidi, Alejandro Alonso, Daniel Barranco and Jordi Jorba were all re-called up to the squad while Gabriel Vélez, David Barrios, Diego Periel and Julen Goia returned to their clubs.

On the 22nd of October, Pablo Miejimolle, Santiago Ovejero, Bastien Dedieu, Michael Hogg, Luciano Molina, Guillermo Moretón, Javier Carrión, Joan Losada and Gauthier Minguillon were called up to the squad for the first time this season while David Barrera and Brice Ferrer, Kerman Aurrekoetxea and Julen Goia were re-called to the national team, whereas Marco Pinto Ferrer, Vicento del Hoyo, Andrés Alvarado, Thierry Futeu, Aníbal Bonán, Lucas Guillaume, Matthew Foulds, Juan Pablo Guido, Fréderic Quercy, Gonzalo Vinuesa, Alejandro Alonso, Fabien Perrin, Sergio Molinero and Guillermo Domínguez were not re-called to the national team.

On the 26th of October, Kawa Leauma and Jerry Davoibaravi were called up to the squad while Tomas Munilla and Julen Goia returned to their clubs, the latter due to injury.

On the 2nd of November, Alberto Blanco was called up to the squad for the first time this season along with Andrés Alvarado, Thierry Futeu, Aníbal Bonán and Matthew Foulds, all of who were re-called to the squad while Bastien Dedieu, Jon Zabala, David Barrera and Luciano Molina returned to their clubs.

On the 9th of November, Marco Pinto Ferrer, Jon Zabala, Lucas Guillaume, Gautier Gibouin, Tomás Munilla, Guillaume Rouet, Manuel Ordas and Fabien Perrin were re-called to the squad while Alberto Blanco, Brice Ferrer, Kerman Aurrekoetxea, Facundo Munilla, Javier Carrión, Jerry Davoibaravi and Pablo Ortiz returned to their clubs.

On the 10th of December, Gavin van den Berg, Joaquín Domínguez, Joel Merkler and Álex Suarez were called up to the squad for the first time this season along with Facundo Munilla, Gonzalo Vinuesa, Julen Goia and Guillermo Domínguez, all of who were re-called to the squad while Pablo Miejimolle, Andrés Alvarado, Thierry Futeu, Jon Zabala, Aníbal Bonan, Victor Sánchez, Matthew Foulds, Gautier Gibouin, Guillermo Moretón, Tomás Munilla, Manuel Ordas and Fabien Perrin were not re-called to the national team.

References

2021 in rugby union